Raising the Wind is a 1961 British comedy film directed by Gerald Thomas. It starred James Robertson Justice, Leslie Phillips, Kenneth Williams, Liz Fraser, Eric Barker and Sid James. The storyline, screenplay and musical score of the film were the work of Bruce Montgomery.

Raising the Wind uses a cast of actors drawn from the Carry On and Doctor films that were popular at the time, although it is not an official member of either series. The premiere took place on 24 August 1961 at the Plaza Theatre in London's Piccadilly Circus.

It is set in an elite music school. The title is typical British comedy double entendre of the period: normally connected to the act of belching, but here also referring to the woodwind section of an orchestra. In the US, the title was changed to Roommates.

Synopsis
Mervyn, Malcolm, Alex, Miranda and Jill are music students at the (fictional) London Academy of Music and the Arts. They decide to share a flat to pool their meagre grants and to find a place to practise. They suffer the put-downs of the acerbic Sir Benjamin Boyd, who conducts the student orchestra, and the antics of the other talented but eccentric teachers at the school.

To raise some much-needed funds, the group offer to play a string quintet recital, but it's a disaster, with instrument strings breaking all the time. More successfully, they play in several performances of Handel's Messiah.

Mervyn, a talented composer, writes a catchy tune and whilst drunk sells it for fifty pounds to Sid and Harry, advertising copywriters. Sober the next day, he realises that he has violated the terms of his grant; the two offer to sell it back to him for five hundred pounds, money he can't possibly raise. He then learns that the tune is an existing one, the 'Alexandra Waltz', which he probably remembered from his youth, so the true composer could theoretically sue the purchasers.

Some of the students go up for a prestigious scholarship, the test for which includes conducting a professional orchestra Sinfonia of London. Mervyn makes a reasonable effort with music by Nikolai Rimsky-Korsakov, but the supercilious know-it-all Harold annoys the musicians with constant criticism and they have their own back on him, with an over-fast rendition of Rossini's William Tell Overture.

To everyone's surprise, the scholarship is awarded to Miranda, but she confesses that she only wants to marry fellow student Mervyn, who likewise is in love with her.  However, Malcolm is given a full time position in Sir Benjamin's orchestra (second trumpet) and proposes to Jill.  Alex leaves school in order to study violin in Amsterdam.

Trivia
 The producers of the film credit the Sinfonia of London for their assistance.
 The exterior of the music school is filmed at University College, London, which also doubled for St Swithin's hospital in several of the 'Doctor' films.
 The recital section of the film was based on anecdotes told to Bruce Montgomery by Eric Coates about the formation of the Celtic String Quartet, who performed only one concert, beset by disasters.

Cast
 James Robertson Justice as Sir Benjamin Boyd
 Leslie Phillips as Mervyn Hughes
 Paul Massie as Malcolm Stewart
 Kenneth Williams as Harold Chesney
 Liz Fraser as Miranda Kennaway
 Eric Barker as Dr. Morgan Rutherford
 Jennifer Jayne as Jill Clemons
 Jimmy Thompson as Alex Spendlove
 Sid James as Sid
 Esma Cannon as Mrs Deevens
 Geoffrey Keen as Sir John
 Jill Ireland as Janet
 Victor Maddern as Removal Man
 Lance Percival as Harry
 Joan Hickson as Mrs Bostwick
 David Lodge as Taxi Driver
 Ambrosine Phillpotts as Mrs Featherstone
 Brian Oulton as Concert Agent
 Christine Andres Coombs as Violin player
 Leonard Hirsch as Orchestra leader violin
 Jim Dale as Cheeky young trombonist
 Ronald Waller as 1st Bassoon in the final orchestral clip
 Eddie Wilson (Albert Edward Wilson) as the 2nd Bassoon in the final orchestra clip
 Dorinda Stevens as Doris

References

External links
 

Films directed by Gerald Thomas
1961 films
British comedy films
1960s English-language films
1961 comedy films
Films shot at Pinewood Studios
Films produced by Peter Rogers
Films set in London
1960s British films